Jared Benson (1821 in Worcester, Massachusetts – 1894) was a Minnesota politician and a former Speaker of the Minnesota House of Representatives. Benson served two stints as speaker, from 1861 to 1862, and again in 1864. He also served as a regent of the University of Minnesota.

References

 

1821 births
1894 deaths
Republican Party members of the Minnesota House of Representatives
Speakers of the Minnesota House of Representatives
19th-century American politicians